Chydaeopsis lumawigi is a species of beetle in the family Cerambycidae. It was described by Breuning in 1980.

References

Acanthocinini
Beetles described in 1980